Feylinia elegans, the elegant feylinia, is an African lizard in the family Scincidae commonly known as skinks. It is found in Equatorial Guinea, Republic of the Congo, Democratic Republic of the Congo, northernmost Angola (including Cabinda), and Central African Republic.

References

Feylinia
Skinks of Africa
Reptiles of Angola
Reptiles of the Central African Republic
Reptiles of the Democratic Republic of the Congo
Reptiles of Equatorial Guinea
Reptiles of the Republic of the Congo
Taxa named by Edward Hallowell (herpetologist)
Reptiles described in 1854